Belonostomus (from  , 'dart' and   'mouth') is a genus of prehistoric ray-finned fish that was described by Louis Agassiz in 1844. It is a member of the order Aspidorhynchiformes, a group of fish known for their distinctive elongated rostrums. The oldest known species are from the Upper Jurassic of Germany, with the youngest known species from the late Paleocene. Fossils of Belonostmus have been found worldwide in marine deposits. It likely consumed plankton or other small fish.

Belonostomus species include:
Belonostomus kochii
Belonostomus acutus
Belonostomus carinatus
Belonostomus crassirostris
Belonostomus indicus
Belonostomus longirostris
Belonostomus münsteri
Belonostomus tenuirostris

References 

Belonostomus, Paleobiology Database

Prehistoric ray-finned fish genera
Cretaceous fish of Africa
Cretaceous fish of Asia
Fossils of Uzbekistan
Bissekty Formation
Prehistoric fish of Australia
Prehistoric fish of South America
Cretaceous animals of South America
Cretaceous Brazil
Fossils of Brazil
Crato Formation
Fossil taxa described in 1834
Taxa named by Louis Agassiz